The Inchtabokatables were a German band active from 1991 to 2002. The band only played on classical instruments (violins, cello, bass and drums). The band was known for their no guitar policy. Their style ranged from folk rock and Medieval rock to punk rock and on later albums even industrial.

History 
The Inchtabokatables were formed on 7 February 1991 in a pub in Berlin called "Bärenschenke". The founding members were B. Breuler, B. Deutung, Herr Jeh, Franzi Underdrive and Kokolorus Mitnichten. Before joining The Inchtabokatables, B. Deutung and Herr Jeh
played together with Subway to Sally singer Eric Fish in the band Catriona. Franzi Underdrive left the band shortly after the release of their debut album 'Inchtomanie'. She was replaced by Oliver Riedel aka Orgien-Olli. After the release of White Sheep and Ultra Riedel went on to join the industrial band Rammstein. He was replaced by Moeh, who played in the industrial band T.A.S.S.. The band's style changed more and more from folk punk to industrial.

Discography

Studio albums 
1992 – Inchtomanie
1993 – White Sheep
1994 – Ultra
1997 – Quiet
1998 – Too Loud
2001 – Mitten im Krieg

Compilations and live albums 
2000 – Nine Inch Years
2002 – Ultimate Live

Singles 
1995 – Merry Christmas/X-mas in the Old Man's Hat
1998 – You Chained Me Up
2001 – Come with Me

Hiatus 
After 11 years of recording and touring, the band decided in 2002 to go on an hiatus.
The band members are now in different projects:
Titus Jany was the drummer for German folk band Potentia Animi, from its formation in 2002 until its disbandment in 2008.
Tobias Unterberg tours with Deine Lakaien and Subway To Sally, he also played cello on the song Too Close to the Sun on New Model Army's album Carnival. Underberg also toured with the popular German band Silbermond and worked on different songs on their first two albums.
Robert Beckmann worked with the German folk metal band In Extremo.
Robert Beckmann and Titus Jany are playing in the band Grüßaugust since 2010.

Further reading 
 
  Novel.

External links 
 

German musical groups